Château-Chinon (Campagne), or Château-Chinon-Campagne, is a commune in the Nièvre department in central France.

This commune groups several villages (Précy, Les Mouilleferts, Planchotte, Le Pont-Charrot, Montbois) all around Château-Chinon.

Demographics
On 1 January 2019, the estimated population was 546.

See also
Communes of the Nièvre department
Parc naturel régional du Morvan

References

Communes of Nièvre
Nivernais